Roberto Bonazzi (born 29 July 1971) is an Italian football coach and former footballer.

Career

Player
He made his professional debut for Leffe making 20 appearances and scoring one goal in Serie C2 in 1990–91.
He played for AlbinoLeffe from the 2001–02 season to the 2007–08 season. He ended his playing career in 2009 with Pergocrema, a newly promoted club in the First Division.

Manager
On 17 November 2009, following the sacking of Claudio Rastelli, he took over with Alessandro Scanziani at the helm of the first team, only to be relieved of his duties again on 24 January 2010, after the defeat to Varese. In 2011-2013 he moved to Hellas Verona, where he led the team in the student category, and then returned, in 2013, to Albino Leffe where as coach of Berretti he won the Category Championship, while in the first team he held the role of assistant coach alongside Elio Gustinetti and qualifying for the Pro League 11th Division Play Off.

On 7 November, following the dismissal of Alessio Pala, he was promoted to the head of the first team of AlbinoLeffe in the Pro League and was sacked after three days due to poor results.

On 29 June 2016, it was announced that he had been appointed as Pro Patria's coach for the 2016-2017 season in the Serie D season. On 14 April 2017, he resigned.

Honours

Player

Individual
 Serie D: 1
Leffe 1989-1990
 Serie C: 1
AlbinoLeffe 2001-2002

References

External links

1971 births
Living people
Italian footballers
Italian football managers
Association football forwards